Château Ksara is a winery in Beqaa Valley Lebanon. Founded in 1857 by Jesuit priests. Château Ksara developed the first dry wine in Lebanon. Château Ksara wine is most popular in Lebanon, but due to a large Lebanese diaspora all over the world, it can be found and purchased in many different countries. Château Ksara produces approximately 3 million bottles annually. Its wines are exported to over 40 countries. Main export markets include Europe, USA, Canada, Japan, Hong Kong, Singapore, Brazil, Africa, Australia and Arab Countries.

Between 2005 and 2015, Château Ksara saw the introduction of new grape varieties in the Bekaa valley. Château Ksara has also seen developments in technique such as vines cultivation on wires and the attentive application of advanced science by French oenologists, who watch over the vinification, fermentation and decanting processes.

Today, the wines of Château Ksara have a specific character, described as a "rare balance of dry fruitiness, of delicacy and coarseness, and of freshness and vigour."

The story

Château Ksara was founded in 1857 by Jesuit Priests who produced the country's first dry red wine.

Château Ksara is Lebanon's oldest, largest and most visited winery, attracting some 70,000 visitors per year.

Château Ksara has a 2 kilometers underground Roman cave.

Vineyards
All of Château Ksara’s vineyards are located in the central and western Bekaa Valley: Ksara Estate, Tanail, Mansoura, Tal el Der, Tal Dnoub, and Kanafar. At an average altitude of 1,000 meters, the Bekaa enjoys dry summers and has a water table fed by the melting snow of the Lebanon and Anti-Lebanon mountain ranges.

The soil ranges from chalk, to clay and chalk, to clay and lime, but it is always stony. The Bekaa enjoys a Mediterranean climate, with heavy rains and snow in the winter, a mild spring and a dry – in some cases very dry – hot summer. The slope on either side of the valley and the valley itself create a unique micro-climate in which the cool nights compensate for the hot summer days.

Products

Red wines
Le Souverain
Le Prieuré
Réserve du Couvent
Cuvée De Printemps
Cuvée IIIème Millénaire
Château Ksara
Cabernet Sauvignon
Carignan

Rose wines
Sunset
Gris de Gris
Rosé de Ksara
Nuance

White wines
Chardonnay
Blanc de Blancs
Blanc de L'Observatoire
Merwah

Sweet fortified wines
Moscatel

Arak
Ksarak

Eau-de-vie
Vieille Eau-de-Vie

Awards
Ksara wine has been featured at wine tasting competitions all over the world.

2013: Berliner Wein Trophy 2013 (Berlin Gold) Château Ksara Red 2010 
2013: Berliner Wein Trophy 2013 (Berlin Gold) Reserve du Couvent 2011 
2013: Vinalies d'Argent Château Ksara Chardonnay 2012 
2013: Vinalies d'Argent Château Ksara Le Prieuré Rouge 2011 
2013: Vinalies d'Or Château Ksara Reserve du Couvent Rouge 2011 
2013: Vinalies d'Argent Château Ksara Le Souverain Cent Cinquantenaire 1857-2007 Rouge 2009 
2012: The Pan Arab Web Awards Academy awarded Château Ksara’s official website www.ksara.com.lb the Golden Award for 2012 out of 450 companies for the beverage category. 
2012: Silver Medal for Réserve du Couvent 2010 in 2012 X Concurso International de Vinos - Spain
2012: Commended for Réserve du Couvent 2010 in 2012 International Wine Challenge
2012: Silver Medal for Le Prieuré, 2010 in 2012 International Wine Challenge
2010-2011: Lebanese Excellence Award
2004: Two gold medals at the Vinalies Internationales Paris in France

See also
 List of Jesuit sites

References

External links
 Chateau Ksara official site

Wineries of Lebanon
Tourism in Lebanon
Tourist attractions in Lebanon
Beqaa Valley